Warren Fraser (born July 8, 1991) is a male track and field athlete from Nassau in the Bahamas, who mainly competes in the 100m.

His personal best over 100m is 10.14 seconds.  He qualified for the 100m at the 2012 Olympic Games, and came fourth in his heat. He was also part of the Bahamian 4 x 100 m team that ran the 4 x 100 m national record at the Commonwealth Games.

In 2014, he competed at the 2014 Commonwealth Games, reaching the final in the men's 100 m and the 4 x 100 m.  He also competed at the 2018 Commonwealth Games.  He has also competed at the 2013, 2015 and 2017 World Championships.  He studied at Clemson University.

Personal bests

References

External links
Clemson Tigers bio
World Athletics

1991 births
Living people
Sportspeople from Nassau, Bahamas
Bahamian male sprinters
Clemson Tigers men's track and field athletes
Olympic athletes of the Bahamas
Athletes (track and field) at the 2012 Summer Olympics
Athletes (track and field) at the 2014 Commonwealth Games
Athletes (track and field) at the 2018 Commonwealth Games
Commonwealth Games competitors for the Bahamas
Athletes (track and field) at the 2015 Pan American Games
Athletes (track and field) at the 2019 Pan American Games
Pan American Games competitors for the Bahamas
World Athletics Championships athletes for the Bahamas